X Factor is a Danish television music competition showcasing new singing talent. Like the end of season 13, season 14 continued live shows without audiences due to the COVID-19 pandemic. Solveig Lindelof won the season and Oh Land became the winning mentor for the first time and Solveig Lindelof became the first winner in the Danish X Factor history to appear in the bottom two.

Judges and hosts
Thomas Blachman and Oh Land returned as judges for a 13th and third season respectively, while Ankerstjerne did not return for a third season. DJ Martin Jensen took over as judge from Ankerstjerne, introducing him to the competition for the first time.

For a sixth season, Sofie Linde Ingversen returned as the host of the show. Sofie hosted the auditions, the returning 5 Chair Challenge, and the Bootcamp. For the live shows, she would take maternity leave, appointing the hosting role to comedian Melvin Kakooza. In late February however, Melvin had a brain tumor, rendering him unable to host the show. Lise Rønne, the former host of seasons 1, 2, 4, and 5, agreed to replace Melvin as host of the show. She was hesitant initially but agreed by reason of circumstances.

Selection process
Auditions took place in Copenhagen and Aarhus.
Oh Land was assigned to mentor the 15-22s category, Martin Jensen the Over 23s, and Blachman the Groups.

The 15 successful acts were:
15-22s: Nikoline Steen Kristensen, Andreas Liebach, Solveig Lindelof, Lucca Nordlund, Julie Toftdal
Over 23s: Hiba Chehade, Vilson Ferati, Julia Ingvarsson, Dan Laursen, Philip Lillelund
Groups: Emmelie & Laura, Fox & Lilly, The Kubrix, Neva & Ida, Simon & Marcus

Kajsa, a group act advancing from the 5 Chair Challenge, withdrew from the competition voluntarily just before entering the Bootcamp stage.

Bootcamp

The 6 eliminated acts were:
15-22s: Andreas Liebach, Julie Toftdal
Over 23s: Julia Ingvarsson, Philip Lillelund
Groups: Emmelie & Laura, Fox & Lilly

Contestants

Key:
 – Winner
 – Runner-up

Live shows

Colour key

Contestants' colour key:
{|
|-
| – Over 23s (Jensen's contestants)
|-
| – 15-22s (Oh Land's contestants)
|-
| – Groups (Blachman's contestants)
|}

Live show details

Week 1 (February 26) 
Theme: Signature

There was no elimination in the first live show. Viewers could still vote, and the votes would go on and be counted in the second live show.

Week 2 (March 5) 
Theme: Songs released in 2020

Judges' votes to eliminate
 Blachman: Hiba Chehade
 Jensen: Neva & Ida
 Oh Land: Hiba Chehade

Week 3 (March 12) 
Theme: Sound of my Childhood
Musical Guest: Folkeklubben ("Børn af den tabte tid")

Judges' votes to eliminate
 Jensen: Neva & Ida
 Blachman: Neva & Ida
 Oh Land: was not required to vote

Week 4 (March 19) 
Theme: Summer
Musical Guest: Lord Siva ("Solhverv") & ("Stjernerne")

Judges' votes to eliminate
 Oh Land: Vilson Ferati
 Jensen: Solveig Lindelof
 Blachman: Vilson Ferati

Week 5 (March 26) 
Theme: Play Danish
Group Performance: ("Føler mig selv 100") 
Musical Guest: Andreas Odbjerg ("I Morgen er en ny dag")

Judges' votes to eliminate
 Blachman: Lucca Nordlund
 Oh Land: The Kubrix
 Jensen: The Kubrix

Week 6: Semi-Final (April 2) 
Theme: Horns & Unplugged
Musical Guest: Alma Agger ("Uundgåelig")

The semi-final did not feature a sing-off and instead the act with the fewest public votes, Dan Laursen received the fewest public votes in the first round and Lucca Nordlund received the fewest public votes in the second round and both were eliminated.

For the first time in the Danish X Factor two acts will be eliminated from the competition in the semi-finals.

Week 7: Final (April 9) 
Theme: Judges Choice, Duet with a Special Guest, Winner Song
Musical Guest: Drew Sycamore ("Take it Back") & ("45 Fahrenheit Girl")
Group Performance: "Move On Up" (Curtis Mayfield performed by the 9 contestants), "Folk skal bare holde deres kæft" (Hugorm performed by Hugorm & the 9 contestants)

References

The X Factor seasons
2021 Danish television seasons